Kathleen is an abandoned town located between Leinster and Wiluna along the Goldfields Highway in the Goldfields-Esperance region of Western Australia.

Gold was discovered in the area in 1897 and it was originally referred to as Kathleen Valley  by the locals since gold had been found in the valley area near the town.

A shop and butchers was opened in 1901 and by 1902 the town supported two hotels. One of the main mines in town was the Yellow Aster mine.

References 

Mining towns in Western Australia
Ghost towns in Western Australia
Shire of Leonora